Raisabad (also Romanized as Ra’īsābād) is a village in Khenaman Rural District, in the Central District of Rafsanjan County, Kerman Province, Iran. At the 2006 census, its population was 400, in 107 families.

References 

Populated places in Rafsanjan County